Carmo da Mata is a municipality in the state of Minas Gerais in the Southeast region of Brazil.

The municipality contained the  Carmo da Mata Biological Reserve.
An audit in 2012 stated that some biological reserves created in 1974 on state-owned land no longer qualified as conservation units. These included Carmo da Mata, Colônia 31 de Março and others.

See also
List of municipalities in Minas Gerais

References

Municipalities in Minas Gerais